Sunt celebru, scoate-mă de aici! is the Romanian version of the I'm a Celebrity...Get Me Out of Here! reality game show. The series premiered on February 16, 2015, on Pro TV. The first season was hosted by Cabral Ibacka and Mihai Bobonete. In season two, Adela Popescu takes over hosting duties from Bobonete.

The series sees celebrities living in the jungle with few creature comforts, and competing in various challenges to earn meals and other luxuries. They compete to be crowned king or queen of the jungle. The show is sponsored by Telekom Romania, a Romanian telecommunications company headquartered in Bucharest.

Since 2021, reports that the series will be revived have circulated in the media, with Pro TV tipped to air the series from 2022 after 7 years of absence.

Format
The premise of the show is that there is a group of well known personalities living together in a specially constructed camp site in a jungle. During their time in the jungle they are isolated from the outside world and are not commonly aware of outside events. While in the jungle, some of the contestants (generally voted by the viewing public) compete in challenges for food and luxuries for the camp. These challenges often involve local wildlife and are meant to gross out the contestants. Each week one or more of the contestants are evicted from the jungle, based on viewer votes. In addition, if the contestants become overwhelmed by their situation they can leave the series by speaking the phrase "I'm a celebrity...get me out of here!". However, it is reported that if contestants do quit they will have their income for participating in the series markedly reduced. Throughout the show, additional contestants (called "intruders") enter the competition; and beginning with season two, some contestants are only included temporarily (i.e. having a guest appearance). In the end, a final viewer vote occurs to determine the winner of the series, who is given the title of "King or Queen of the Jungle".

Production
The first season was broadcast daily on Pro TV channel at 8:30 pm, since 16 February 2015. The second season currently airs on Sundays at 8:00 and Mondays and Tuesdays at 8:30 pm.

Filming location

Like the Australian versions until 2020, the first season of Romanian version was produced in Kruger National Park, South Africa. The second season was set on La Romana, Dominican Republic.

Challenges

Tucker trials
Bush Tucker trials are used in the show to allow the contestants to gain food and treats for camp. Bush Tucker Trials take two formats: eating trials and physical/mental tasks.

In the eating trials, contestants are required to eat a variety of different "jungle" foods. Each dish successfully eaten will gain the contestants one star, which equals one meal for camp (although the number of meals per star can vary). The foods that are required to be eaten can include: crickets (in a variety of forms, such as cooked into biscuits, blended into drinks or eaten alive or dead), green ants, mealworms, witchetty grub, roasted spider or tarantulas, crocodile penis, cockroach (prepared in various ways such as being cooked into biscuits, blended into drinks, eaten alive or dead). Other past foods include beach worms, bull's tongues, the anus of various animals, vomit fruits, cooked pigs' brains, various animal testicles, raw fish eyes, sheep eyes, blended rats or mice tails.

The second type of challenge is more of a physical or mental task that requires the contestants to perform activities to gain stars. These can include searching through dung, going through tunnels, negotiating obstacles on high wires, or performing other tasks.

Celebrity Chest challenges
Two or more celebrities are chosen to take part in the "Celebrity Chest" challenge to win luxuries for camp. Each challenge involves completing a task to win a chest to take back to camp. However, to win the luxury item in the chest, the campmates must correctly answer a question. If they fail to answer correctly, the luxury item is forfeited and a joke prize is won.

Series details
Winners are crowned King or Queen of their respective year.

Key:
 King of the Jungle
 Queen of the Jungle

Ratings
Official ratings are taken from ARMA (Asociaţia Română pentru Măsurarea Audienţelor), the organisation that compiles audience measurement and television ratings in Romania.

Awards and nominations

References

External links 
 SuntCelebru.ProTV.ro - Official website
 

I'm a Celebrity...Get Me Out of Here!
Television shows set in South Africa
Romanian reality television series
2015 Romanian television series debuts
2010s Romanian television series
Pro TV original programming